Een Ander Joods Geluid (A Different Jewish Voice) (EAJG) is a Dutch-Jewish organisation founded in May 2001 to promote the public debate concerning Israel. It wants to break the perceived silence in the Dutch-Jewish community concerning the occupation of the Palestinian Territories by Israel, and strives to support peace activities in this same area.

The first time the Dutch public was confronted with the Een Ander Joods Geluid was in October 2000, when a group of Dutch Jews published several ads in national newspapers and the Nieuw Israëlitisch Weekblad (New Israelite Weekly, the biggest Jewish newspaper in the Netherlands). The organisation was founded in May 2001 by Anneke Mouthaan (a peace activist) and Harry de Winter (producer, television host), and co-operates with SIVMO (Steuncomité Israëlische Vredesgroepen en Mensenrechtenorganisaties) (Support Committee Israeli Peacegroups and Human Rights Organisations). The underlying thought of Een Ander Joods Geluid is that is should be possible for Jews to criticize the actions of Israel. The founding of the organisation received a lot of criticism from within the Jewish community. The organisation was accused of promoting Jewish self-hate; giving ammunition to opponents of Israel; and attacking Jewish unity.

External links
 Een Ander Joods Geluid 
 SIVMO 
 EJJP, European Jews for a Just Peace, to which EAJG belongs
 Interview on Dutch television with three prominent Dutch Jews: members of EAJG Harry de Winter (producer) and Hanneke Groenteman (journalist), and television host Frits Barend (not a EAJG member)

Jewish Dutch history
Jewish anti-occupation groups
Non-governmental organizations involved in the Israeli–Palestinian conflict
Mass media about the Arab–Israeli conflict
Organizations established in 2001